The 1983 Pacific typhoon season was the latest start for a Pacific typhoon season on record. It has no official bounds, but most tropical cyclones tend to form in the northwestern Pacific Ocean between May and November. These dates conventionally delimit the period of each year when most tropical cyclones form in the northwestern Pacific Ocean. Tropical storms formed in the entire west Pacific basin were assigned a name by the Joint Typhoon Warning Center. Tropical depressions that enter or form in the Philippine area of responsibility are assigned a name by the Philippine Atmospheric, Geophysical and Astronomical Services Administration or PAGASA. This can often result in the same storm having two names.

The season had a late start, as the first system did not form until early June for the first time since 1973. The last tropical cyclone dissipated in mid-December. A total of 26 tropical depressions formed this year in the Western Pacific, of which 23 became tropical storms. Of the 26 tropical cyclones, one formed in June, three formed in July, six formed in August, three formed in September, seven formed in October, five formed in November, and two formed in December. Twelve storms reached typhoon intensity, of which four reached super typhoon strength. Fifteen of the tropical cyclones made landfall, with six moving through the Philippines, six striking China, six moving into Vietnam, and three moving in Japan. Vera, Wayne, Kim, and Lex led to over half of the fatalities from tropical cyclones this season.

Season summary 

The season had a late start, as the first system did not form until late June for the first time since 1973. The last tropical cyclone dissipated in mid-December. A total of 26 tropical depressions formed this year in the Western Pacific, of which 23 became tropical storms. Of the 26 tropical cyclones, one formed in June, three formed in July, six formed in August, three formed in September, seven formed in October, five formed in November, and two formed in December. Ten storms reached typhoon intensity, of which four reached super typhoon strength. The activity of the season was reflected with an ACE of 220 units. Fifteen of the tropical cyclones made landfall, with six moving through the Philippines, six striking China, six moving into Vietnam, and three moving in Japan. Tropical cyclones accounted for 24 percent of the annual rainfall in Hong Kong this season.

Wayne formed east of the Philippines, becoming the first super typhoon of the season before striking mainland China on July 25. Abby was a long-lived system, forming near Guam and remaining an intense typhoon for a number of days before recurving into Japan as a weakening tropical storm on August 17. Ellen was a strong typhoon which tracked from the International Dateline westward near the northern Philippines and mainland China by September 9. Marge was an intense typhoon which recurved well off the coast of Asia during the first week of November. Orchid was a long-lived and erratic tropical cyclone which moved slowly just east of the Philippines during late November, absorbing Percy along the way. Vera, Wayne, Kim, and Lex led to over half of the fatalities from tropical cyclones this season.

Systems

Tropical Storm Sarah 

When Tropical Storm Sarah formed in the South China Sea on June 24, it became the latest start of a western Pacific season since 1973. The initial tropical disturbance formed south of Guam on June 16. By June 19, a low level circulation formed as the system moved westward. As a tropical disturbance, the low crossed the Philippines with light winds. The system finally organized into a tropical depression and then a tropical storm on June 25. Sarah moved west-northwestward across the South China Sea, striking Central Vietnam before dissipating on June 26. Damage across the Philippines totaled 2.77 billion Philippine Pesos (1983 pesos), or US$249.3 million (1983 dollars).

Typhoon Tip (Auring) 

A tropical disturbance first noted east of the Philippines, the system moved through the archipelago as a tropical depression before strengthening briefly to a typhoon in the South China Sea. A combination of northeasterly vertical wind shear and proximity to land weakened the cyclone to a tropical storm before its landfall on Hai-nan and struck Chan Chiang, China as a tropical depression.

Typhoon Vera (Bebeng) 

The monsoon trough spawned a tropical depression on July 12, east of the Philippines. It headed westward, strengthening to a tropical storm that night and a typhoon on the 13th. Vera made landfall on the 14th as an  typhoon in the Philippines, weakened over the islands, and restrengthened over the South China Sea to a  typhoon. Damage totaled US$9 million in the Philippines. Vera struck Hainan Island on the 17th, crossed the Gulf of Tonkin, and made landfall near Haiphong, Vietnam on the 18th. Vera brought torrential flooding, resulting in the deaths of 106 people.

Typhoon Wayne (Katring) 

Becoming a tropical depression east of the Philippines, Wayne strengthened rapidly to become a tropical storm on July 22, a typhoon on July 23, and a super typhoon around midday on July 24 before moving south of Taiwan into mainland China on July 25 and dissipating. In the Philippines, 20 perished due to flash flooding. Wayne was the fifth most intense tropical cyclone to impact Fujian between 1960 and 2005. Heavy rainfall led to severe flooding in Fujian and Guangdong. The total death toll reached 105.

Typhoon Abby (Diding) 

First noted southeast of Guam on July 31, this system slowly matured into the season's second super typhoon as it moved west-northwest over the following nine days. Intensification was most rapid as it was slowly recurving northward on August 7 and August 8. After peaking early on August 9, Abby slowly weakened as it interacted with the main belt of the Westerlies. It managed to remain a major typhoon, with winds at or above , for a week. Abby finally weakened back into a tropical storm on August 17 just before its landfall at Hamamatsu, Japan. By late that night, Abby completed the transition to an extratropical cyclone after moving through central Japan. Two perished from Abby in Japan. Its deluge led to numerous landslides and the destruction of 19 bridges. Commercial traffic by land, sea, and air was also paralyzed by the cyclone.

Tropical Storm Carmen (Etang) 

Originating in the monsoon trough in the South China Sea in early August, a low level circulation was first spotted about 370 km east of Vietnam on August 8. Slow development ensued, and the system became a tropical depression during the night of August 12. Tracking slowly north-northeast, Carmen began to accelerate to the east-northeast towards the Luzon Strait, steered by Abby. This acceleration was likely a redevelopment of the low-pressure area downshear. The system became a tropical storm early morning of August 14 as it continued to close the distance to Abby. By late morning on August 15, absorption into Abby was complete.

Severe Tropical Storm Ben 

An area of strong thunderstorms formed east of Abby, developing a low level center on August 12 on the western side of the thunderstorm activity, due to westerly vertical wind shear from nearby Abby. It developed into a tropical storm that night and moved northwest due to Abby's influence on the steering across the western Pacific at that time. Turning to the west, Ben moved along the southern coast of Honshū and made landfall west of Hamamatsu. Due to land interaction and increasing upper level westerly wind shear, Ben became an exposed low level circulation on August 14 in the Sea of Japan, eventually dissipating late on August 15.

Tropical Storm Dom (Gening) 

On August 17, a tropical disturbance was noted west of Guam. Slow development ensued, and the system became a tropical storm late on August 19. As a deep cyclone near Japan linked up with the monsoon trough, the cyclone turned sharply northeast on August 20. Persisitently sheared by strong northeasterly flow aloft initially, once Dom recurved its convection was left completely behind, weakening the system to a tropical depression on August 21. Thunderstorms began to redevelop near the center, and by midday on August 23 Dom was a tropical storm once more. At this point Dom was moving erratically as the trough near Japan moved off to the east, and by August 24 Dom turned back to the north-northwest. By August 25 strong winds aloft weakened Dom once more, and the cyclone dissipated as a tropical cyclone on August 26.

Tropical Depression 09W 

This system formed well north of the normal climatological position to the west of Dom, as the monsoon trough was similarly displaced. It was first noted on August 25, but showed no further development. The system did develop some central convection, and moved northward into South Korea, bringing showers to the region, and dissipated late on August 27.

Typhoon Ellen (Herming) 

It was first noted as a tropical disturbance east of the International Dateline on August 26, and became a tropical storm soon after crossing in the dateline on the morning of August 29. A strong high pressure ridge offshore Japan led to no further development over the next 5 days, and the cyclone began to track south of west. Dropping down to a weak tropical depression late on September 1, conditions aloft finally improved and the cyclone strengthened into a typhoon on September 3 as it tracked west-northwest. Approaching Luzon late on September 5, Ellen intensified rapidly into a strong typhoon before the terrain began to weaken the cyclone. Its final landfall was at Macau on the morning of September 9 as a minor typhoon.

Hong Kong experienced extensive damage, with six killed and 277 injured. Twenty-two ships ran aground in the harbor. Rainfall totaled  at Hong Kong's Royal Observatory. The second tornado ever recorded in Hong Kong, and the first during a typhoon passage, occurred during Ellen. Ellen was Hong Kong's worst typhoon since Typhoon Hope of 1979. By late on the 9th, Ellen was rapidly dissipating in mainland China.

Tropical Depression 02C

Typhoon Forrest (Ising) 

Super Typhoon Forrest developed in the Western Pacific Ocean in September over the open ocean. A tornado struck Inza Island, destroying 26 homes and injuring 26 people, as the cyclone passed by Okinawa. Forrest struck Japan as a tropical storm on the 28th. Overall, the storm caused 21 casualties and moderate damage.

Typhoon Georgia (Luding) 

A large area of thunderstorm activity formed west of the Philippines. Rapidly organizing on September 28, Georgia became a tropical storm by the next morning. Moving westward, it tracked across Hainan Island to the south of China. Wind gusts reached  both at Tate's Cairn and Kowloon Tsai Hill in Hong Kong. Ultimately the storm made its final landfall in Hà Nam Ninh, Vietnam before dissipating while entering Laos. The  of rainfall it brought to Vietnam relieved drought conditions.

Tropical Depression Mameng 

This system was recognized by the Hong Kong Royal Observatory, the JMA and the PAGASA. A tropical depression formed in the South China Sea near Xisha Dao on October 2, and moved northwest, dissipating near Hanoi a couple days later.

Tropical Storm Herbert (Neneng) 

Moving westward for the next few days without development, the system moved into the South China Sea. The system became a tropical storm on October 7 to due significantly increased low-level southwesterlies spinning up its circulation. The cyclone then moved west-northwest, striking Nha Trang, Vietnam. The convective pattern was slow to fade as it drifted westward across Indochina over the next few days. Forty perished during this tropical cyclone.

Severe Tropical Storm Ida (Oniang) 

An inverted trough appeared near Saipan on October 6, which appears to be linked with pre-existing convection within an upper-level cyclone, which appeared as early as October 3. By late on the 6th, a closed circulation formed. Continuing to develop, the system became a tropical depression on the morning of October 8 as it moved northwest. Becoming a typhoon on October 10 as it was recurving into the main belt of the Westerlies, the cyclone passed only 150 km southeast of Honshū. Since it was a small cyclone, no damage occurred within Japan. By late on October 11, Ida evolved into an extratropical cyclone which moved eastward through the northern Pacific.

Severe Tropical Storm Joe (Pepang) 

One of three consecutive tropical cyclones to form in the South China Sea, the initial disturbance was first noted well south of Guam on October 6. The system moved westward, and developed a closed wind circulation by midday on October 9. A new center formed to the south, which complicated the system's development. Remaining poorly organized in the Philippine Sea due to northerly vertical wind shear, the tropical depression crossed central Luzon. Now in the South China Sea, the system became better organized and developed into a tropical storm and typhoon as it moved northwest. Wind gusts reached  at Tai O, while rainfall amounts of  fell at Tate's Cairn.

Tropical Storm Kim (Rosing) 

Tropical Storm Kim, which formed in the South China Sea on October 14, hit southeastern Vietnam late on October 16. It weakened over land, but retained its circulation, and redeveloped into a tropical depression on October 19 in the northeastern Bay of Bengal in the North Indian Ocean. Kim continued northwestward, and dissipated on October 20 over Myanmar. Even though Tropical Storm Kim was a weak storm, its heavy rains caused serious flash flooding and mudslides in Vietnam and Thailand. In Thailand, already deluged by an earlier tropical storm, there was moderate flooding in Bangkok. Elsewhere, over 300 boats and 3,000 homes and buildings were destroyed and the storm severely damaged much of the rice harvest. Kim caused 200 fatalities and extensive crop damage from heavy rainfall.

Severe Tropical Storm Lex (Sisang) 

First noted near the Marshall Islands on October 14, the tropical disturbance moved westward for the next couple of days without and further development. An upper-level ridge built over the system on October 16 while near Truk, which encouraged slow development. The system developed a weak surface circulation which progressed across the central Philippines. Once it entered the South China Sea, development increased and it became a tropical depression, then tropical storm, on October 22. Transcribing a cyclonic loop, Lex continued to intensify and was a typhoon by October 25.

Moving close to Hainan Island, Lex weakened to a tropical storm while entering the Gulf of Tonkin. The cyclone made landfall near Đồng Hới, Vietnam on October 26 as a moderate tropical storm, and then rapidly weakened after moving inland. At least 200 fishermen were killed, with 81 of the total from the oil drilling ship Glomar Java Sea which sank during the storm.

Tropical Depression Trining

Typhoon Marge (Uring) 

This system began as a tropical disturbance with a weak circulation near 7N 172E. Becoming the fourth super typhoon of the season, Marge stairstepped west-northwest east of the Philippines before recurving east of Japan. During recurvature, its forward motion reached , becoming one of the fastest known tropical cyclones on record.

Tropical Storm Norris 

This system was spawned just ahead of a frontal boundary extending from the extratropical cyclone formerly known as Marge. A midget tropical storm, Norris quickly evolved on November 8 and recurved ahead of the frontal boundary well east of Asia, primarily threatening shipping in the western Pacific. Within three days of formation, Norris had been absorbed by the advancing cold front.

Typhoon Orchid (Warling) 

A tropical disturbance organized into a tropical depression on November 14 over the open West Pacific. It tracked southwestward then westward, slowly organizing into a tropical storm on the 17th. Orchid's motion became erratic, and it drifted northward, always remaining within  of Typhoon Percy, a slow-moving typhoon in the South China Sea. Orchid reached her peak of  winds on the 23rd, before vertical shear caused it to weaken. The storm turned southward, where it dissipated on the 27th. A total of 167 fatalities occurred when the Philippine vessel MV Dona Cassandra capsized due to high waves off the coast of Mindanao. A total of 219 people survived the shipwreck, including 98 that were rescued. In addition, 89 persons were injured, 18 at sea. At the time of the shipwreck, the boat had 387 passengers and 36 crew members. Onshore the Philippines, three people were killed and thousands were displaced.

Typhoon Percy (Yayang) 

Located not too distant to the southwest of Orchid, Percy thrived in a divergent region created by Orchid's outflow pattern beginning on November 17. Rapid development occurred on the morning of November 19 while in the South China Sea, and the system meandered due to the weakness in steering created by Orchid to its northeast. The cyclone managed  of movement through November 23. Briefly becoming a typhoon, eventually Percy became entrained in Orchid's inflow band and began to be sheared by Orchid's opposing outflow pattern. Other than moving through the Philippines while in the initial tropical depression phase, Percy affected no other land masses.

Severe Tropical Storm Ruth (Ading) 

This system began along the near equatorial trough southeast of Guam on November 15. Moving slowly westward, there was little additional development until November 19. The system moved slowly northwest until November 23. Orchid acted to limit its development by robbing inflow from this disturbance. On the 23rd it became a tropical depression before executing an anticyclonic loop. Upper-level conditions became hostile soon afterwards, and the depression weakened. Into November 27 the system moved erratically and went through cycles of convective development and shearing. When Orchid weakened into a tropical depression, Ruth began to develop rapidly and became a tropical storm early on November 28. A frontal zone on its northwest side led to an intense gale in that quadrant, which led to the upgrade. The cyclone nearly became a typhoon later that day before vertical wind shear returned, introduced by a fresh cold outbreak from Asia. The cyclone degenerated to an exposed low-level swirl on November 30.

Tropical Storm Sperry (Barang) 

The initial disturbance formed along the near equatorial trough after Ruth dissipated. Taking a day to recover, the system attempted to reorganize and became a tropical storm early on December 3. Southerly vertical wind shear limited its development for much of its life cycle. Turning eastward, it reached its maximum intensity late on the 3rd before shearing apart on December 4. Early on December 5, the system degenerated into a weak area of low pressure.

Severe Tropical Storm Thelma (Krising) 

This system formed east of the Caroline Islands on December 11 near 4N 170E. Over the next couple days, an upper cyclone to its north shifted westward, which helped lead to increased outflow and a low-level circulation. It moved rapidly westward for the next 60 hours as a poorly defined low despite increasing convective organization. By late morning on December 16, it became a tropical storm. The system tracked along a smooth parabola east of the Philippines becoming a moderately strong tropical storm.

Tropical Depression Dadang

Storm names

International 

During the season 23 named tropical cyclones developed in the Western Pacific and were named by the Joint Typhoon Warning Center, when it was determined that they had become tropical storms. These names were contributed to a revised list from 1979.

Philippines 

The Philippine Atmospheric, Geophysical and Astronomical Services Administration uses its own naming scheme for tropical cyclones in their area of responsibility. PAGASA assigns names to tropical depressions that form within their area of responsibility and any tropical cyclone that might move into their area of responsibility. Should the list of names for a given year prove to be insufficient, names are taken from an auxiliary list, the first 6 of which are published each year before the season starts. Names not retired from this list will be used again in the 1987 season. This is the same list used for the 1979 season. PAGASA uses its own naming scheme that starts in the Filipino alphabet, with names of Filipino female names ending with "ng" (A, B, K, D, etc.).

Season effects 
This table will list all the storms that developed in the northwestern Pacific Ocean west of the International Date Line and north of the equator during 1983. It will include their intensity, duration, name, areas affected, deaths, missing persons (in parentheses), and damage totals. Classification and intensity values will be based on estimations conducted by the JMA. All damage figures will be in 1983 USD. Damages and deaths from a storm will include when the storm was a precursor wave or an extratropical low.

|-
| TD ||  || bgcolor=#| || bgcolor=#| || bgcolor=#| || South China ||  None ||  None ||
|-
| TD ||  || bgcolor=#| || bgcolor=#| || bgcolor=#| || Philippines ||  ||  None ||
|-
| Sarah ||  || bgcolor=#| || bgcolor=#| || bgcolor=#| || Vietnam, Laos, Cambodia ||  None ||  None ||
|-
| Tip (Auring) ||  || bgcolor=#| || bgcolor=#| || bgcolor=#| || Philippines, South China ||  None ||  None ||
|-
| Vera (Bebeng) ||  || bgcolor=#| || bgcolor=#| || bgcolor=#| || Caroline Islands, Philippines, South China, Vietnam ||  ||  ||
|-
| Wayne (Katring) ||  || bgcolor=#| || bgcolor=#| || bgcolor=#| || Philippines, South China ||  Unknown ||  ||
|-
| Abby (Diding) ||  || bgcolor=#| || bgcolor=#| || bgcolor=#| || Caroline Islands, Japan || Unknown ||  ||
|-
| Gil ||  || bgcolor=#| || bgcolor=#| || bgcolor=#| || Wake Island ||  None ||  None ||
|-
| Carmen (Etang) ||  || bgcolor=#| || bgcolor=#| || bgcolor=#| || Philippines ||  None ||  None ||
|-
| Ben ||  || bgcolor=#| || bgcolor=#| || bgcolor=#| || Japan ||  None ||  None ||
|-
| Dom (Gening) ||  || bgcolor=#| || bgcolor=#| || bgcolor=#| || None ||  None ||  None ||
|-
| TD ||  || bgcolor=#| || bgcolor=#| || bgcolor=#| || South China ||  None ||  None ||
|-
| 09W ||  || bgcolor=#| || bgcolor=#| || bgcolor=#| || Ryukyu Islands, Korean Peninsula ||  None ||  None ||
|-
| Ellen (Herming) ||  || bgcolor=#| || bgcolor=#| || bgcolor=#| || Caroline Islands, Philippines, Taiwan, Southeast China ||  ||  ||
|-
| 02C ||  || bgcolor=#| || bgcolor=#| || bgcolor=#| || Marshall Islands ||  None ||  None ||
|-
| Forrest (Ising) ||  || bgcolor=#| || bgcolor=#| || bgcolor=#| || Caroline Islands, Mariana Islands, East China, South Korea, Japan || Unknown ||  ||
|-
| Georgia (Luding) ||  || bgcolor=#| || bgcolor=#| || bgcolor=#| || Philippines, South China, Vietnam, Laos || Unknown ||  ||
|-
| Mameng ||  || bgcolor=#| || bgcolor=#| || bgcolor=#| || Philippines, Vietnam, Laos ||  None ||  None ||
|-
| Herbert (Neneng) ||  || bgcolor=#| || bgcolor=#| || bgcolor=#| || Philippines, Vietnam, Cambodia ||  None ||  None ||
|-
| Ida (Oniang) ||  || bgcolor=#| || bgcolor=#| || bgcolor=#| || Mariana Islands, Japan ||  None ||  None ||
|-
| Joe (Pepang) ||  || bgcolor=#| || bgcolor=#| || bgcolor=#| || Philippines, South China ||  None ||  None ||
|-
| Kim (Rosing) ||  || bgcolor=#| || bgcolor=#| || bgcolor=#| || Philippines, Vietnam, Cambodia, Thailand ||  || > ||
|-
| Lex (Sisang) ||  || bgcolor=#| || bgcolor=#| || bgcolor=#| || Philippines, South China, Vietnam, Laos ||  Unknown || > ||
|-
| Trining ||  || bgcolor=#| || bgcolor=#| || bgcolor=#| || Philippines, Vietnam ||  None ||  None ||
|-
| Marge (Uring) ||  || bgcolor=#| || bgcolor=#| || bgcolor=#| || Caroline Islands, Mariana Islands || None || None ||
|-
| Norris ||  || bgcolor=#| || bgcolor=#| || bgcolor=#| || None || None || None ||
|-
| Orchid (Warling) ||  || bgcolor=#| || bgcolor=#| || bgcolor=#| || Caroline Islands, Philippines || Unknown ||  ||
|-
| Percy (Yayang) ||  || bgcolor=#| || bgcolor=#| || bgcolor=#| || Vietnam, Philippines || Unknown || None ||
|-
| Ruth (Ading) ||  || bgcolor=#| || bgcolor=#| || bgcolor=#| || Caroline Islands ||  None || None ||
|-
| Sperry (Barang) ||  || bgcolor=#| || bgcolor=#| || bgcolor=#| || None ||  None || None ||
|-
| Thelma (Krising) ||  || bgcolor=#| || bgcolor=#| || bgcolor=#| || Caroline Islands ||  None || None ||
|-
| Dadang ||  || bgcolor=#| || bgcolor=#| || bgcolor=#| || Philippines ||  None ||  None ||
|-

See also 

 List of Pacific typhoon seasons
 1983 Pacific hurricane season
 1983 Atlantic hurricane season
 1983 North Indian Ocean cyclone season
 Australian cyclone seasons: 1982–83, 1983–84
 South Pacific cyclone seasons: 1982–83, 1983–84
 South-West Indian Ocean cyclone seasons: 1982–83, 1983–84

References

External links 
 Japan Meteorological Agency
 Joint Typhoon Warning Center .
 National Weather Service Guam
 Hong Kong Observatory
 Macau Meteorological Geophysical Services
 Philippine Atmospheric, Geophysical and Astronomical Services Administration
 Taiwan Central Weather Bureau
 Satellite movie of the 1983 Pacific typhoon season

 
Articles which contain graphical timelines
1983 WPAC